Los Cerritos Wetlands is located in both Los Angeles County and Orange County in the cities of Long Beach, California, and Seal Beach, California. The San Gabriel River, historically and currently flows through the Los Cerritos Wetlands Complex.   

Los Cerritos Wetlands is very close to the Pacific Ocean with waters at high tides bringing shallow ocean water over portions of the marshland.  Some portions of Los Cerritos Wetlands are fed by winter rainfall creating ephemeral pools. 

They were historically the wetlands of Puvunga.

Environment and wildlife 

Los Cerritos Wetlands consists of two functioning marshes (Steamshovel Slough and Zedler Marsh), plus a number of seasonal brackish ponds, all with an abundance of wildlife.  The wetlands is home to several endangered species, including the Belding's Savannah sparrow, California least tern, California brown pelican, wandering skipper, and the tiger beetle. A number of species protected under other acts also inhabit the wetlands, in addition to the many common plants and animals typical of a California coastal salt marsh habitat.

Most of the remaining open space, once a thriving wetlands consisting of tidal salt marshes, lagoons, bays and alkali meadows where the San Gabriel River flows into the Pacific Ocean, is currently privately owned and used for oil operations.  Rising sea level related to climate change threatens to drown the marsh and wetland forever, exacerbated if levees are removed to allow additional seawater to enter this ecosystem.  A coalition of public and private entities are working together to protect, purchase, and restore the remaining roughly 500 acres.

Restoration project 

The cities of Long Beach and Seal Beach, the California Coastal Conservancy, the Rivers and Mountains Conservancy  several local businesses, grassroots and community groups, and citizens are working to protect, purchase and restore the remaining acreage of the Los Cerritos Wetlands.

 of land has been acquired by the Los Cerritos Wetlands Authority; a total of  within the wetland boundaries are now public lands.  The official community-based restoration “kick off” began September 19, 2009, with the Los Cerritos Wetlands Stewardship Program’s Zedler Marsh Cleanup Day event.  Regular habitat restoration days have since been held.  A conceptual restoration plan for the entire Los Cerritos Wetlands complex is underway.

Environmental Impact Report 
The Los Cerritos Wetlands Authority (LCWA) has certified the Final Environmental Impact Report (EIR) for the Los Cerritos Wetlands to continue efforts to provide a comprehensive restoration framework for the Los Cerritos Wetlands. The LCWA initiated the preparation of its EIR to determine the nature and extent of the proposed program’s impact upon the environment. An EIR also identifies ways to reduce environmental effects and analyzes reasonable alternatives to avoid or minimize significant environmental effects.

The proposed program would restore wetland, transitional, and upland habitats throughout the program area. This would involve remediation of contaminated soil, grading, revegetation, construction of new public access opportunities (including trails, visitor centers, parking lots, and viewpoints), construction of flood management facilities (including earthen levees, berms, and walls), and modification of existing infrastructure and utilities.

See also

Ballona Wetlands Ecological Preserve
Gardena Willows Wetland Preserve
Los Angeles River
Madrona Marsh
Bixby Marshland

References

External links 
 Los Cerritos Wetlands Land Trust
 Los Cerritos Wetlands Authority
 Los Cerritos Stewards

Geography of Long Beach, California
Wetlands and marshes of Los Angeles County, California
Landforms of Orange County, California
Natural history of Los Angeles County, California
Parks in Los Angeles County, California
Nature reserves in California
Long Beach, California
Seal Beach, California